Shalazhi (Şalaƶa) is a rural locality (a selo) in the Urus-Martanovsky District, the Chechen Republic, Russia.

Geography
Shalazhi is located west of the republic on the foothills of the Greater Caucasus mountains and is located on the banks of the Shalezha River.

The nearest settlements to Shalazhi are Katyr-Yurt and Valerik in the north, Gekhi-Chu in the east and Yandi in the north-west.

History

1944–1958
In 1944, after the genocide and deportation of the Chechen and Ingush people and the Chechen-Ingush ASSR was abolished, the village of Shalazhi (Şalaƶa) was renamed to Podgornoye.

In 1958, after the Vaynakh people returned and the Chechen-Ingush ASSR was restored, the village regained its old names, Shalazhi in Russian, and Şalaƶa in Chechen.

Present time 
In 2020, the village made headlines as the place where Abdullah Anzorov was buried. A young radicalized Chechen refugee living in France with his family, he decapitated a history teacher named Samuel Paty he believed was guilty of blasphemy against the Prophet Muhammad. 

His burial, which was filmed with a cellphone and published on the internet, attracted significant controversy. Cries of Allah u Akbar (God is great in Arabic) accompanied the funeral procession are considered as support for Paty's murder, denied by some as being just a tribute to his death, like any deceased Muslim. Another controversy erupted after Russian news site news.ru claimed a street had been renamed in Anzorov's honour. The Chechen television of the Kadyrov administration (Grozny TV) denied this rumor, believing that is a fake news and a photo montage.

Population
 1979 Census: 5,044
 1990 Census: 5,639
 2002 Census: 5,307
 2010 Census: 4,998
 2012 Census: 5,032
 2013 Census: 5,078
 2014 Census: 5,094
 2015 Census: 5,133
 2016 Census: 5,169
 2017 Census: 5,212
 2018 Census: 5,267
 2019 Census: 5,313
 2020 Census: 5,332

References

Rural localities in Urus-Martanovsky District
1840 establishments in the Russian Empire